The 2021–22 season is Hartlepool United's 113th year in existence and their first season back in League Two after 4 years. Along with competing in League Two, the club will also participate in the FA Cup, EFL Cup and EFL Trophy.
The season covers the period from 1 July 2021 to 30 June 2022.

Players

Transfers

Transfers in

Loans in

Loans out

Transfers out

Competitions

Pre-season friendlies
On 5 July 2021, Hartlepool's pre-season schedule was announced.

League Two
Main article: 2021–22 EFL League Two

League table

Results summary

Results by matchday

Matches 
Hartlepool United's league fixtures were released on 24 June 2021.

FA Cup 

Hartlepool were drawn at home to Wycombe Wanderers in the first round, away to Lincoln City in the second round and at home to Blackpool in the third round.

EFL Cup 
Hartlepool United were drawn at home to Crewe Alexandra in the first round.

EFL Trophy 

Hartlepool were drawn into Northern Group A alongside Carlisle United, Everton U21s and Morecambe. On 6 July 2021, the date and times of the fixtures were announced. In the knock-out stages, United were drawn at home to Bolton Wanderers in the third round.

Squad statistics

Appearances and goals 

|}

Goalscorers

Clean sheets

Suspensions

Awards
On 1 May 2022, Hartlepool's end of season awards were held at the Hardwick Hall Hotel in Sedgefield.

References 

Hartlepool United
Hartlepool United F.C. seasons